"Ramblin' on My Mind" is a blues song recorded on November 23, 1936, by Delta blues musician Robert Johnson. He recorded two takes of the song, which were used for different pressings of the 78 rpm records issued by both the Vocalion and ARC record companies.

The song used the melody made popular by Walter Davis in his hit record "M & O Blues". Johnson composed two songs to this melody, "Ramblin' on My Mind" and "When You Got a Good Friend", with different musical approaches and different guitar tunings.  For "Ramblin' on My Mind" he used an open tuning that allowed him to combine a boogie shuffle on the bass strings with bottleneck triplets on the treble strings. These slide triplets were the model for Elmore James's guitar accompaniment to "Dust My Broom".

Members of the family of Ike Zimmerman, who taught Johnson improve his guitar technique, have claimed that "Ramblin' on My Mind", was in fact written by him. They argue they had heard the song from Ike before he met Johnson.

Eric Clapton recordings
The song was recorded by John Mayall & the Bluesbreakers with Eric Clapton for Blues Breakers with Eric Clapton (1966). It was Clapton's first solo vocal recording and in his autobiography he explained:

Clapton later recorded versions that appear on Just One Night (1980), Crossroads 2: Live in the Seventies (1996), Sessions for Robert J (2004), and Live from Madison Square Garden (2009).

References

Robert Johnson songs
Songs written by Robert Johnson
1937 songs
Song recordings produced by Don Law